Polysphondylium is a genus of cellular slime mold, including the species Polysphondylium pallidum. The genus was circumscribed by German mycologist Julius Oscar Brefeld in 1884.

Species
Polysphondylium acuminatum Vadell & Cavender 1998 nom. inv.
Polysphondylium aureum Hodgson & Wheller 2001 nom. inv.
Polysphondylium fuscans Perrigo & Romeralo 2012
Polysphondylium laterosorum (Cavender 1970) Baldauf, Sheikh & Thulin 2017 
Polysphondylium patagonicum Vadell et al. 2011
Polysphondylium violaceum Brefeld 1885

See also
Dictyostelium so-called cellular slime mold.

References

Amoebozoa genera
Mycetozoa
Taxa named by Julius Oscar Brefeld